General elections were held in Italy on Sunday, 2 June 1946. They were the first after World War II and elected 556 deputies to the Constituent Assembly. Theoretically, a total of 573 deputies were to be elected, but the election did not take place in the Julian March and in South Tyrol, which were under military occupation by the United Nations.

For the first time, Italian women were allowed to vote in a national election. It was held concurrently with the 1946 Italian institutional referendum on the abolition of the monarchy.

Electoral system
To emphasise the restoration of democracy after the fascist era, a pure party-list proportional representation was chosen. Italian provinces were united in 31 constituencies, each electing a group of candidates. At constituency level, seats were divided between open lists using the largest remainder method with the Imperiali quota. Remaining votes and seats were transferred at national level, where special closed lists of national leaders received the last seats using the Hare quota.

Campaign
At the end of World War II, Italy was governed under transitional laws as a result of agreements between the National Liberation Committee (CLN) and the royal Lieutenant General of the Realm Umberto II of Italy. As no democratic elections had taken place for more than 20 years, legislative power was given to the government but, after the first election, the Italian Council of Ministers would have to receive a vote of confidence by the new Constituent Assembly.

The three main contestants were Christian Democracy and the Italian Socialist Party, which had both received popular support before the fascist era, and the Italian Communist Party, which had strengthened itself with the armed struggle against Nazism and fascism during the war. The Italian Liberal Party, heir of the pre-fascist and conservative ruling class, proposed an alliance called National Democratic Union. Monarchists groups created the National Bloc of Freedom, while the liberal socialist Action Party and Labour Democratic Party hoped to maximize the positive image of the governments that they ruled in the National Liberation Committee.

Parties and leaders

Results
The election gave a large majority to the government formed by the three leaders of the CLN, which was briefly joined by the Republican Party after the exile of Umberto II. The alliance lasted for a year.

By constituency

Maps

Referendum

Together with the election, a constitutional referendum took place. Italian electors chose whether to continue the reign of Umberto II of Italy or turn Italy into a republic. While all regions of northern Italy as far as Tuscany and Marches gave a majority to the republic, all regions of southern Italy to Lazio and Abruzzo voted to maintain the monarchy.

Notes

References

General elections in Italy
Italy
General election
Italy